Representation of cannibals exist adjacent to the representation of any culture associated with alterity, political discourse, or blasphemous rhetoric. Homer's Odyssey, Beowulf, Shakespeare's Titus Andronicus, Flaubert's Salammbo, Conrad's Heart of Darkness, and Melville's Moby Dick each feature a type of cannibalistic representation that is larger than the ambiguity of cultural versus survival cannibalism.

European Literature

Travel Narratives 

Travel narrative is a literary genre characterized by factual reportage represented and interpreted through techniques better known in fiction. Other aspects of travel literature include the disciplines of ethnography, geography, history, economics, and aesthetics. Travel narratives were used in the ages of discovery to map the world and, during the exploration of the New World, establish traits of indigenous people, survey for gold, and relate back to sovereigns the positives of their investments while encouraging more travel. This style of writing can be traced back to the 1st century.

Christopher Columbus 
Christopher Columbus invented the term "cannibal" after arriving in the Bahamas in 1492 during his search for India. The friendly Arawak tribe described an island of enemies, the "Carib" or "Caniba" depending on translation, who, as Columbus described them, ate men with their monstrous dog snouts. The binary of friend and foe, good and evil, man and eater can be traced to this point in Western literature.

European 
Cannibalism comes up with surprise frequency in European literature during the High Middle Ages. The symbolism of cannibalism and representation of cannibals is used "as a literary response to the politics of external conquest, internal colonization, and territorial consolidation". References occurring due to the rising influence of colonization and its relation to identity of self and of others categorically unknown.

Charles Dickens 
For theorists like James Marlow, Charles Dickens's literary use of cannibalism could be an extension of his personal beliefs and fascinations, becoming more of a psychoanalytical tool, rather than a literary one.

North American Literature

American Literature 

"Cannibalism in the Cars" is an 1868 short story by Mark Twain in which the narrator meets a member of Congress who talks about their descent into cannibalism on a train. Twain's use of "parliamentary cannibalism" satirises 19th century American politics.

Toni Morrison uses the "jungle savage" stereotype and imagery to present "polemic points about racial, sexual, and class conflicts in American, African American, and Black Atlantic culture." Her novels The Bluest Eye (1970), Sula (1973), and Beloved (1987) use cannibalism in the particular context of black narratives in the white "standard".

The Bluest Eye tells the story of a young African-American girl, Pecola Breedlove, who is regarded as ugly according to the white beauty standard. As a result, she develops an inferiority complex, fueling her desire for blue eyes and whiteness. At one point, she purchases a few pieces of candy called Mary Janes, which feature a picture of a beautiful little white girl with blue eyes, called Mary Jane. Pecola fixates on this fictional girl: "Each pale yellow wrapper has a picture on it. A picture of little Mary Jane, for whom the candy is named. Smiling white face. Blond hair in gentle disarray, blue eyes looking a her out of a world of clean comfort. The eyes are petulant, mischievous. To Pecola they are simply pretty,. She eats the candy, and its sweetness is good. To eat the candy is somehow to eat the eyes, eat Mary Jane. Love Mary Jane. Be Mary Jane." Morrison uses symbolic cannibalism to represent Pecola's "entrapment in a globalized capitalist system in which intensively plantation-farmed sugar and its teeth-rotting products are signs of Third World peoples' exploitation both as workers and consumers."

Beloved tells the story of a formerly enslaved family whose home is haunted by a malevolent spirit. The titular character, Beloved, "had two dreams: exploding and being swallowed." Morrison again uses the cannibal trope to characterize the exploitation and inner exploration of slavery.

South American Literature 
"Tender is the Flesh" is a 2017 Argentinian dystopian novel written by Agustina Bazterrica focusing on a society which consumes human flesh instead of animal flesh as a satire on capitalism.

African Literature

Asian Literature 
In "Romance of the Three Kingdoms", Xiahou Dun engages in autocannibalism when he is shot in the eye in a show of bravery and filial piety towards his parents. Additionally, while Liu Bei is traveling, he takes shelter with a hunter overnight. The hunter is unable to hunt any animals to feed him, and murders his own wife so that the visiting warlord might have meat. This pleases Cao Cao when he hears of it, and the hunter is rewarded. This showed the Confucian values of being filial and of respecting those of a higher rank than oneself, along with the lack of value women had at the time.

In Ming and Qing dynasty literature, filial children engage in the practice of "gegu" or cutting of their own flesh and feeding it to their parents in order to extend the lifespan of their parents.

"Diary of a Madman" is a 1918 short story written by Lu Xun, credited as the first Chinese modern short story. It concerns a "madman" who begins to see "cannibalism" in his community, his family, and ultimately between the lines of Confucian text. The use of cannibalism becomes the catalyst of satire and critique of Chinese society's dependence on Confucian idealism. An effect of this idealism, to Lu Xun, was the cannibalizing of the family.

References 

Wikipedia Student Program
Literature